Isopogon asper is a species of plant in the family Proteaceae and is endemic to the south-west of Western Australia. It is a low shrub with crowded pinnate leaves and flattened spherical heads of glabrous pink flowers.

Description

Taxonomy
Isopogon asper was first formally described in 1830 by Robert Brown in the Supplementum to his Prodromus Florae Novae Hollandiae et Insulae Van Diemen from specimens collected in 1827 near the Swan River, by Charles Fraser.

Distribution and habitat
This isopogon grows in low open heath, often with soil derived from granite, from Harvey to near Jurien Bay in the south-west of Western Australia.

Conservation status
This isopogon is classified as "not threatened" by the Government of Western Australia Department of Parks and Wildlife.

References

asper
Endemic flora of Western Australia
Eudicots of Western Australia
Taxa named by Robert Brown (botanist, born 1773)
Plants described in 1830